Phillip Augustus Griffiths IV (born October 18, 1938) is an American mathematician, known for his work in the field of geometry, and in particular for the complex manifold approach to algebraic geometry. He was a major developer in particular of the theory of variation of Hodge structure in Hodge theory and moduli theory. He also worked on partial differential equations, coauthored with Shiing-Shen Chern, Robert Bryant and Robert Gardner on Exterior Differential Systems.

Professional career
He received his BS from Wake Forest College in 1959 and his PhD from Princeton University in 1962 after completing a doctoral dissertation, titled "On certain homogeneous complex manifolds", under the supervision of Donald Spencer. Afterwards, he held positions at University of California, Berkeley (1962–1967) and Princeton University (1967–1972). Griffiths was a professor of mathematics at Harvard University from 1972 to 1983. He was then a Provost and James B. Duke Professor of Mathematics at Duke University from 1983 to 1991. From 1991 to 2003, he was the Director of the Institute for Advanced Study (IAS) in Princeton, New Jersey. He remained as part of the Faculty of Mathematics at the IAS until June 2009, after which he has been emeritus at the IAS. He has published on algebraic geometry, differential geometry, geometric function theory, and the geometry of partial differential equations.

Griffiths serves as the Chair of the Science Initiative Group. He is co-author, with Joe Harris, of Principles of Algebraic Geometry, a well-regarded textbook on complex algebraic geometry.

Awards and honors
Griffiths was elected to the National Academy of Sciences in 1979 and the American Philosophical Society in 1992. In 2008 he was awarded the Wolf Prize (jointly with Deligne and Mumford) and the Brouwer Medal. In 2012 he became a fellow of the American Mathematical Society. Moreover, in 2014 Griffiths was awarded the Leroy P. Steele Prize for Lifetime Achievement by the American Mathematical Society. Also in 2014, Griffiths was awarded the Chern Medal for lifetime devotion to mathematics and outstanding achievements.

Selected publications

Articles

with Joe Harris: 
with S. S. Chern:

Books
 Mumford–Tate groups and domains: their geometry and arithmetic, with Mark Green and Matt Kerr, Princeton University Press, 2012, 
  in pbk:    
 Exterior differential systems and Euler-Lagrange partial differential equations, with Robert Bryant and Daniel Grossman, University of Chicago Press, 2003,  cloth; 
 Introduction to Algebraic Curves, American Mathematical Society, Providence, RI, 1989, 
 Differential Systems and Isometric Embeddings, with Gary R. Jensen, Princeton University Press, Princeton, NJ, 1987, 
 Topics in Transcendental Algebraic Geometry, Princeton University Press, Princeton, NJ, 1984, 
 Exterior Differential Systems and the Calculus of Variations, Birkhäuser, Boston, 1983, 
 Rational Homotopy Theory and Differential Forms, with John W. Morgan, Birkhäuser, Boston, 1981, 
 Principles of Algebraic Geometry, with Joe Harris, Wiley, New York, 1978, 
 Entire Holomorphic Mappings in One and Several Complex Variables, Princeton University Press, Princeton, NJ, 1976,

References

External links
 
 Science Initiative Group page

1938 births
Living people
20th-century American mathematicians
21st-century American mathematicians
Algebraic geometers
Differential geometers
Institute for Advanced Study faculty
Directors of the Institute for Advanced Study
Princeton University alumni
University of California, Berkeley faculty
Princeton University faculty
Harvard University faculty
Duke University faculty
Brouwer Medalists
Recipients of the Great Cross of the National Order of Scientific Merit (Brazil)
Wolf Prize in Mathematics laureates
Members of the United States National Academy of Sciences
Fellows of the American Mathematical Society
Foreign Members of the Russian Academy of Sciences
Mathematicians from North Carolina
People from Raleigh, North Carolina
Woodward Academy alumni
Members of the American Philosophical Society